The Clear Creek Bridge, in Butler County, Nebraska near Bellwood, Nebraska, was built in 1891.  It is a Warren through truss bridge.  It was listed on the National Register of Historic Places in 1992.

It is a  single-span bridge.  It was designed and built by the King Bridge Co. of Cleveland, Ohio;  it was fabricated by the CRM Co.

Its 1991 National Register nomination noted that "the bridge's integrity has been diminished by later alterations, [but] this fact is mitigated by the structure's extreme rarity and age. Among Nebraska's oldest vehicular spans, the crossing continues to carry vehicular traffic."  In 2010, the bridge was blocked off and no longer carried traffic.

References

External links

Bridges on the National Register of Historic Places in Nebraska
Warren truss bridges in the United States
National Register of Historic Places in Butler County, Nebraska
Bridges completed in 1891
King Bridge Company